The micrantha is a wild citrus from the papeda group, native to southern Philippines, particularly islands of Cebu and Bohol. Two varieties are recognized: small-flowered papeda (C. hystrix var. micrantha), locally known as biasong, and small-fruited papeda (C. hystrix var. microcarpa) or samuyao.

Long viewed as a separate species, C. micrantha, it is now generally viewed to fall within Citrus hystrix, but genomic data on the latter is insufficient for a definitive conclusion. A micrantha was one of the progenitor species of some varieties of lime.

Description

The micrantha was first described to Western science in 1915 by Peter Jansen Wester, who worked for the Philippine Bureau of Agriculture at the time.

Biasong
Wester collected ripe fruit specimens of biasong (small-flowered papeda, Citrus hystrix var. micrantha) on islands of Cebu, Bohol, Dumaguete, Negros, and in the Zamboanga and Misamis provinces in Mindanao. The fruits were collected throughout the year, indicating that the plant is ever-bearing. Biasong is characterized by small flowers (thus the "small-flowered" moniker) with fewer stamens than other papedas and oblong-obovate, few-loculed fruits. Inhabitants did not use the fruits for food, but for hair-washing, and it had little economic importance.

Biasong's aroma is similar to that of the samuyao variety of micrantha. The tree reaches  in height. Flowers are small, four-petaled, white with a thin purple edge,  in diameter, forming cymes of two to five. There are 15 to 17 equal stamens. The ovary is obovoid, with 6 to 8 slender, distinct locules. They have numerous flat, pointed, reticulate seeds.

Samuyao
Wester collected ripe samuyao (small-fruited papeda, Citrus hystrix var. microcarpa) fruit specimens from cultivation in Cebu and Bohol in June, and from November to February. Samuyao is rather smaller than biasong, with trees attaining 4.5 meters. It has small, thin leaves and flowers comparable in size to biasong. The fruit, 15–20 mm in diameter, is likely to be the smallest in the whole genus. Wester also recorded a somewhat more vigorous variety, called "samuyao-sa-amoo" in Bohol, with slightly larger fruits; there is a possibility that this species was actually Limonellus aurarius, described by Georg Eberhard Rumphius back in 1741 in a nearby area, although his description also fits a number of related species.
Wester gave the botanical description: 

Clear, intensely fragrant oil can be produced from the samuyao peel, and it has been used as a hair fragrance by women who live where it grows.

Toxicity
The micrantha contains a significant amount of bergapten, a linear furanocoumarin well known for its phototoxic effects. Of 61 Citrus varieties tested, C. micrantha had the highest concentration of bergapten of any Citrus species. In particular, C. micrantha contained almost twice as much bergapten as the bergamot orange whose essential oil is highly phototoxic. Indiscriminate use of bergamot essential oil has led to several cases of phytophotodermatitis, a potentially severe skin inflammation. In these cases, the primary causal agent is believed to be bergapten.

Hybrids
The Key lime (Citrus aurantifolia) is a hybrid of the micrantha and the citron. It, in turn, has been crossed with a lemon to produce the Persian lime (C. latifolia).  There are lumias that are distinct micrantha/citron hybrids, such as the Pomme d'Adam, while other lumias, like the Borneo lemons, are micrantha/citron/pomelo tri-species hybrids. An Indonesian hybrid, the nansaran (C. amblycarpa), is a C. hystrix/C. reticulata cross.

References

External links
 Searching for the Elusive Samuyao, "Our Philippine Trees" blog
 Looking for the Elusive Biyasong, "Our Philippine Trees" blog

Micrantha
Flora of the Philippines
Plants described in 1915